Branch insignia of the Iranian Police refers to military emblems that may be worn on the uniform of the Iranian Police to denote membership in a particular area of expertise and series of functional areas.

Branch of service insignia
The following are the branch insignia emblems of the Iranian Police:
 "

See also
 Badges of honor in Iran
 Iranian Army Branch Insignia
 Islamic Revolutionary Guard Corps Branch Insignia

Military Branch Insignia of Iranian Police
Law enforcement in Iran